Malmö FF competed in Allsvenskan and Svenska Cupen for the 2002 season.

Players

Squad stats

| Signed from

|}

Competitions

Allsvenskan

League table

Matches

Club

Kit

|
|

Other information

References
 

Malmö FF seasons
Malmo FF